Aplectropus is a genus of moths of the family Crambidae. It contains only one species, Aplectropus leucopis, which is found in Yemen.

References

Pyraustinae
Monotypic moth genera
Moths of Asia
Crambidae genera
Taxa named by George Hampson